Seward is a city in Stafford County, Kansas, United States.  As of the 2020 census, the population of the city was 41.

History
Seward was named for William H. Seward. A post office was opened in Seward in 1878, and remained in operation until it was discontinued in 1995.

Geography
Seward is located at  (38.177593, -98.795480).

Demographics

2010 census
As of the census of 2010, there were 64 people, 31 households, and 16 families living in the city. The racial makeup of the city was 100.0% White.

There were 31 households, of which 16.1% had children under the age of 18 living with them, 38.7% were married couples living together, 6.5% had a female householder with no husband present, 6.5% had a male householder with no wife present, and 48.4% were non-families. 45.2% of all households were made up of individuals, and 19.4% had someone living alone who was 65 years of age or older. The average household size was 2.06 and the average family size was 3.00.

The median age in the city was 46 years. 23.4% of residents were under the age of 18; 3.2% were between the ages of 18 and 24; 18.9% were from 25 to 44; 31.4% were from 45 to 64; and 23.4% were 65 years of age or older. The gender makeup of the city was 57.8% male and 42.2% female.

2000 census
As of the census of 2000, there were 63 people, 34 households, and 17 families living in the city. The racial makeup of the city was 96.83% White, and 3.17% from two or more races.

There were 34 households, out of which 26.5% had children under the age of 18 living with them, 44.1% were married couples living together, 5.9% had a female householder with no husband present, and 50.0% were non-families. 44.1% of all households were made up of individuals, and 23.5% had someone living alone who was 65 years of age or older. The average household size was 1.85 and the average family size was 2.59.

In the city, the population was spread out, with 17.5% under the age of 18, 6.3% from 18 to 24, 22.2% from 25 to 44, 31.7% from 45 to 64, and 22.2% who were 65 years of age or older. The median age was 51 years. For every 100 females, there were 110.0 males. For every 100 females age 18 and over, there were 108.0 males.

The median income for a household in the city was $16,250, and the median income for a family was $16,667. Males had a median income of $20,625 versus $16,250 for females. The per capita income for the city was $14,891. None of the population and none of the families were below the poverty line.

References

Further reading

External links
 Seward - Directory of Public Officials
 USD 351, local school district
 Seward city map, KDOT

Cities in Kansas
Cities in Stafford County, Kansas